Saturday Satan Sunday Saint is an album by American country singer Ernest Tubb, released in 1969 (see 1969 in music).

Track listing
"She's Looking Better by the Minute" (Jimmie Helms, Grant Townsley)
"If I Ever Stop Hurtin'" (Billy Hughes)
"Games People Play" (Joe South)
"Making Believe" (Jimmy Work)
"The Carroll County Accident" (Bob Ferguson)
"Just a Drink Away" (Bobby Lewis, Billy Parker)
"Saturday Satan Sunday Saint" (Wayne P. Walker)
"Today I Started Loving You Again" (Merle Haggard, Bonnie Owens)
"Folsom Prison Blues" (Johnny Cash)
"Tommy's Doll" (Glenn D. Tubb, Jack Moran)
"One More Memory" (Bobby George, Vern Stovall)

Personnel
Ernest Tubb – vocals, guitar
Billy Parker – guitar
Steve Chapman – guitar
Buddy Charleton – pedal steel guitar
Noel Stanley – bass
Harold Bradley – bass
James Wilkerson – bass
Errol Jernigan – drums
Jerry Smith – piano
The Jordanaires – background vocals

Chart positions

References

Ernest Tubb albums
1969 albums
Albums produced by Owen Bradley
Decca Records albums